Peter Francis McDonald (born 1946) is an Australian demographer and Emeritus Professor of Demography in the Crawford School of Public Policy of the Australian National University. He is known for his research on fertility transition and migration. He researched extensively in Southeast Asia.

In 2016 McDonald was appointed Professor of Demography and head of the Demography Unit within the Centre for Health Policy at the University of Melbourne.

Career
He had a significant impact on demographic teaching, research and policy formulation and received the Population Association of America's Irene B. Taeuber Award in 2015. In 2013 the Prime Minister of Australia, Malcolm Turnbull, described McDonald as "arguably the world’s leading demographer".
McDonald won Iran's Book of the Year Award for the book The Fertility Transition in Iran: Revolution and Reproduction (with Meimanat Hosseini-Chavoshi and Mohammad Jalal Abbasi-Shavazi).

References

Australian demographers
Academic staff of the Australian National University
Academic staff of the University of Melbourne
Living people
1946 births